Santhipalayam is a panchayat village in Gobichettipalayam taluk in Erode District of Tamil Nadu state, India. It is about 14 km from Gobichettipalayam and 50 km from district headquarters Erode. The village is located on the road connecting Gobichettipalayam with Kunnathur. Santhipalayam has a population of about 3721.

References

Villages in Erode district